The kings of Thomond ruled from the establishment of Thomond during the High Middle Ages, until the Early modern period. Thomond represented the legacy of Brian Bóruma and the High Kings of Ireland of his line who could not hold onto all of Munster, so had to partition the realm between themselves and Desmond, ruled by their rivals the Eóganachta. The Kings of Thomond were drawn from the leading kindred of the Dál gCais known as the Ó Briain. For centuries they fought off challenges from the Normans, including the de Clare family and internal conflict between factions. Eventually Murchadh Carrach Ó Briain decided to surrender and regrant his realm to the Kingdom of Ireland in 1543 and accepted the titles Baron Inchiquin and Earl of Thomond.
The current holder of these titles is Conor Myles John O'Brien.

Kings of Thomond

Ó Briain, 1118-1277

|-
| Conchobhar Ó Briain 1118–1142 ||  || Son of Diarmuid Ó Briain ||unknown || 1142
|-
| Toirdhealbhach mac Diarmada Ua Briain 1142–1167 ||  || Son of Diarmuid Ó Briain ||unknown || 1167
|-
| Muircheartach mac Toirdelbhach Ó Briain 1167–1168 ||  || Son of Toirdelbhach mac Diarmaida Ó Briain ||unknown || 1168
|-
| Domhnall Mór Ó Briain 1168–1194 ||  || Son of Toirdelbhach mac Diarmaida Ó Briain ||Orlacan Ní MurchadaFour children|| 1194
|-
| Muircheartach Dall Ó Briain 1194–11981203–1210 ||  || Son of Domhnall Mór Ó Briain and Orlacan Ní Murchada||unknown|| 1210
|-
| Conchobhar Ruadh Ó Briain 1198–1203 ||  || Son of Domhnall Mór Ó Briain and Orlacan Ní Murchada||unknown|| 1203
|-
| Donnchadh Cairbreach Ó Briain 1210–1242 ||  || Son of Domhnall Mór Ó Briain and Orlacan Ní Murchada||unknown|| 1242
|-
| Conchobhar na Suidaine Ó Briain 1242–1268 ||  || Son of Donnchadh Cairbreach Ó Briain||unknown|| 1268
|-
| Brian Ruadh Ó Briain 1268–12761277 ||  || Son of Conchobhar na Suidaine Ó Briain||unknown|| 1277
|-
|}

Ó Briain Clann Tadhg, 1276-1311

|-
| Toirdhealbhach Mór Ó Briain 1276–1306 ||  || Son of Tadhg Cael Uisce Ó Briain ||unknown || 1306
|-
| Donnchadh mac Toirdelbach Ó Briain 1306–1311 ||  || Son of Toirdelbach Ó Briain ||unknown || 1311
|-
|}

Ó Briain Clann Briain Ruadh, 1277-1284

|-
| Donnchadh mac Brian Ruadh Ó Briain 1277–1284(claimant) ||  || Son of Brian Ruadh Ó Briain ||unknown || 1284
|-
|}

Ó Briain Clann Briain Ruadh, 1311-1317

|-
| Diarmuid Cléirech Ó Briain 1311–1313||  || Son of Donnchadh mac Brian Ruadh Ó Briain ||unknown || 1313
|-
| Donnchadh mac Domhnall Ó Briain 1313–1317 ||  || Son of Domhnall mac Brian Ruadh Ó Briain and Mairéad Nic Mathghamhna||unknown || 1317
|-
|}

Ó Briain Clann Tadhg, 1317-1343

|-
| Muircheartach Ó Briain 1317–1343 ||  || Son of Toirdhealbhach Mór Ó Briain||Éadaoin Nic GormáinSeveral children || 1343
|-
|}

Ó Briain Clann Briain Ruadh, 1343-1350

|-
| Brian Bán Ó Briain 1343–1350 ||  || Son of Domhnall mac Brian Ruadh Ó Briain and Mairéad Nic Mathghamhna||unknown || 1350
|-
|}

Ó Briain Clann Tadhg, 1350-1543

|-
| Diarmuid mac Toirdelbach Ó Briain 1350–1360 ||  || Son of Toirdelbach Ó Briain||unknown || 1360
|-
| Mathghamhain Maonmhaighe Ó Briain 1360–1369 ||  || Son of Muircheartach Ó Briain and Éadaoin Nic Gormáin||Úna Ní ConchubhairSeveral children|| 1369
|-
| Brian Sreamhach Ó Briain 1369–1400 ||  || Son of Mathghamhain Maonmhaighe Ó Briain and Úna Ní Conchubhair||Sláine Nic Con MaraSeveral children || 1400
|-
| Toirdelbhach Maol Ó Briain 1375–1398(claimant) ||  || Son of Muircheartach Ó Briain and Éadaoin Nic Gormáin||unknown || 1398
|-
| Conchobhar mac Mathghamhna Ó Briain 1400–1426 ||  || Son of Mathghamhain Maonmhaighe Ó Briain and Úna Ní Conchubhair||unknown || 1426
|-
| Tadhg an Glemore Ó Briain 1426–1438 ||  || Son of Brian Sreamhach Ó Briain and Sláine Nic Con Mara||unknown || 1438
|-
| Mathghamhain Dall Ó Briain 1438–1444 ||  || Son of Brian Sreamhach Ó Briain and Sláine Nic Con Mara||unknown || 1444
|-
| Toirdhealbhach Bóg Ó Briain 1444–1459 ||  || Son of Brian Sreamhach Ó Briain and Sláine Nic Con Mara||Catherine BurkeSeveral children || 1459
|-
| Tadhg an Chomhaid Ó Briain 1459–1466 ||  || Son of Toirdhealbhach Bóg Ó Briain and Catherine Burke||Annabella BurkeSeveral children || 1466
|-
| Donnchadh mac Mathghamhna Ó Briain 1459–1461(claimant) ||  || Son of Mathghamhain Dall Ó Briain||unknown || 1461
|-
| Conchobhar na Srona Ó Briain 1466–1496 ||  || Son of Toirdhealbhach Bóg Ó Briain||unknown || 1496
|-
| Toirdelbhach Óg Ó Briain 1496–1498 ||  || Son of Toirdhealbhach Bóg Ó Briain and Catherine Burke||unknown || 1498
|-
| Toirdhealbhach Donn Ó Briain 1498–1528 ||  || Son of Tadhg an Chomhaid Ó Briain and Annabella Burke||Raghnailt Nic Con MaraSeveral childrenJoan FitzMauriceSeveral children || 1528
|-
| Conchobhar mac Toirdhealbaig Ó Briain 1528–1539 ||  || Son of Toirdelbhach Donn Ó Briain and Raghnailt Mac Con Mara||unknown || 1539
|-
| Murchadh Carrach Ó Briain 1539–1543 ||   || Son of Toirdelbhach Donn Ó Briain and Raghnait MacNamara||Eleanor FitzGerald || 1551
|-
|}

Line of Kings

See also
 List of High Kings of Ireland
 List of kings of Munster
 List of kings of Desmond
 List of kings of Ulster
 List of kings of Leinster
 List of kings of Connacht
 List of kings of Mide

Notes

References

External links
Official Website of Clan O'Brien

 
 
 
 
 
 
O'Brien dynasty
Thomond
 
Dál gCais